Ronny Ostwald (born 7 April 1974, in Beeskow) is a German sprint athlete.

He finished 8th in the 100m final at the 2006 European Athletics Championships in Gothenburg.

He has had more success as a relay runner for Germany, winning a bronze medal in the 4 × 100 m relay at the 2002 European Athletics Championships (belatedly when the United Kingdom team were disqualified after Dwain Chambers failed a drugs test in 2004) and competing in the relay team at the 2004 Summer Olympics.

References 
 
 Sports Reference
 European Championships

1974 births
Living people
People from Beeskow
People from Bezirk Frankfurt
German male sprinters
Sportspeople from Brandenburg
German national athletics champions
Olympic athletes of Germany
Athletes (track and field) at the 2004 Summer Olympics
European Athletics Championships medalists